

Events

Births

Deaths
 Heinrich von Morungen died 1220 or 1222 (born unknown), a German Minnesänger
 Maria de Ventadorn (born unknown), an Occitan troubadour

See also

Poetry
 List of years in poetry

13th-century poetry
Poetry